La Magdalena Chichicaspa  is a locality in the municipality of Huixquilucan in the State of Mexico. It is on the municipality's northern border with Naucalpan and contains Bosque Real Country Club.

History

The area was inhabited by Otomi people prior to colonization. In the 18th century, the Chichicaspa chapel was built, bringing with it a shrine to Mary Magdalene, Franciscan monks, and evangelization.
During the Mexican Revolution, Isidoro Silva and Macario Gutiérrez gathered men and horses for Emiliano Zapata's army from the locality.

In the 1960s, Constantino Gutiérrez discovered a sand and gravel mine in the "Las Campanitas" area of the locality, currently collectively owned by the ejido.

Gastronomy
Traditional foods include barbacoa, carnitas tacos, and traditional candies made from milk, sugar and tamarind.

Highways
Two highways pass through La Magdalena Chichicaspa:
 Mexican Federal Highway 134 (Naucalpan–Toluca)
 State Highway 6 (Tenango–La Marquesa)

Customs and traditions
The locality has two major fairs, in celebration of Mary Magdalene (July 22) and the Immaculate Conception (July 8).

Subdivisions
The locality is subdivided into the following parajes and barrios:
Barrio Barranca Honda
Barrio Dogora (La Piedra)
Barrio El Badhu (Badho)
Barrio El Calvario
Barrio El Escobal
Barrio El Hielo
Barrio El Llorón
Barrio El Machero
Barrio El Mango
Barrio El Manzano
Barrio El Paraíso
Barrio El Río
Barrio El Yeto
Barrio Erosha
Barrio La Canoa
Barrio La Cebada
Barrio La Cumbre
Barrio La Guadalupe
Barrio La Magueyera (La Capilla)
Barrio La Manzana
Barrio La Verdolaga
Barrio Las Campanitas (Ejido de La Magdalena Chichicaspa)
Barrio Las Flores
Barrio Madho
Barrio Moki (Las Máquinas)
Barrio Moni
Barrio Ñuni
Barrio Shido
Barrio Tixpada
Paraje Bandolón
Paraje El Dingui
Paraje El Pejo
Paraje Enchaqui
Paraje La Bota
Paraje La Canaleja
Paraje La Finca
Paraje La Palma
Paraje La Ratonera

Public transportation

The town is served by route 4 of the private bus system of Huixquilucan. The ejido also has its own association of taxi drivers.

References

 http://mexico.pueblosamerica.com/i/magdalena-chichicaspa/
 https://www.facebook.com/profile.php?id=100008253331798

Populated places in the State of Mexico
Huixquilucan